U.S. Route 54 (US 54) in Texas is a U.S. Highway that travels through two portions of the state:  one in the far western point, and the other in the far northwest Panhandle.

Route description
US 54 begins in El Paso, Texas, as a controlled access highway at an intersection with Loop 375.  The route then travels northward, joining up with I-110 within the first mile.  A mile later, these highways intersect Interstate 10 at a complex, three level high expressway interchange which the locals call the "Spaghetti Bowl."  I-110 ends here, while US 54 continues north through El Paso.  The route turns northeast, becoming a rare example of a collector–express freeway in Texas (until the Pershing Drive exit) before entering New Mexico.  The route re-enters Texas in the northwest Panhandle, traveling northeast through sparsely populated country.  The route intersects US Route 87 and US Route 385 in Dalhart and US Route 287 in Stratford, before exiting into the Oklahoma Panhandle at Texhoma.

History

The southwestern portion was originally part of the Ozark Trails, paralleling the El Paso and Southwestern Railroad, and was originally given the numbering of State Highway 33.  SH 33 continued into Texas farther south in the Panhandle, following the former Ozark Trail.  The northern Panhandle portion was originally assigned to State Highway 56, paralleling the Chicago, Rock Island, and Gulf Railroad.

When the U.S. Highway System was unveiled in 1926, the northern section was assigned to U.S. Highway 54, while the southwestern portion was assigned to U.S. Highway 366.  The US 366 designation was canceled in 1932 when other sections of the highway were added to an adjusted US Route 70.  This section was added to US 54 in 1934, and has retained its numbering since.  By 1939, the corresponding state highway designations had been canceled.

The highway continues on its original routing except for realignment in 1990 in El Paso, with the old route becoming US Business Route 54 and Texas Loop 478. Most of the current US 54 in El Paso is a limited-access highway known as the Patriot Freeway which, as of 2016, was only partially completed.

Future
US 54 from Haggerty Drive in northeast El Paso to the New Mexico state line is planned to eventually be upgraded to freeway status.

Major intersections

El Paso business loop

Business U.S. Highway 54-A or Bus. US 54-A is a business route of US 54 at El Paso commissioned in 1990. The  route begins at US 54 and State Highway Loop 478 at the Patriot Freeway. The route runs along Dyer Street through Northeast El Paso near Fort Bliss to its northern terminus at the New Mexico state line. Highway signs in New Mexico direct westbound US 54 traffic to turn left on Edge of Texas Street at the state line to access Bus. US 54-A.

Bus. US 54-A and Loop 478 are the former route of US 54 prior to construction of the Patriot Freeway. Bus. US 54-A was created when Loop 478, which originally followed the route to New Mexico, was shortened to its current terminus at the beginning of the business loop. Loop 478 was first intended in 1969 to be the replacement for US 54 over the route and was planned to be signed as Business US 54 once the current US 54 was completed. Bus. US 54-A was concurrent with US 54 until 1991.

Major intersections

See also

References

54
 Texas
U.S. Route 66 in Texas
Transportation in El Paso County, Texas
Transportation in Hartley County, Texas
Transportation in Dallam County, Texas
Transportation in Sherman County, Texas